François Aupetit (2 March 1913 – 1945) was a French boxer who competed in the 1936 Summer Olympics. In 1936 he was eliminated in the first round of the lightweight class after losing his fight to Czesław Cyraniak.

References

External links
 

1913 births
1945 deaths
Lightweight boxers
Olympic boxers of France
Boxers at the 1936 Summer Olympics
French male boxers